The Doesburgermolen is a post mill in the hamlet of Doesburgerbuurt in the community of Ede, Netherlands

It is considered to be the oldest post mill in the Netherlands; in its present form it was probably built around 1630. It underwent a major restoration around 1970.

The mill is operated by volunteers and is still used for grinding grain.

External links 
 www.doesburgermolen.nl

References

 Wijnia, A,  De Doesburger Molen, Ede 1992
 Gelders molenboek, De Walburg Pers Zutphen 1969

Post mills in the Netherlands
Windmills in Gelderland
Rijksmonuments in Gelderland